CHTO (1690 kHz) is a commercial AM radio station in Toronto, Ontario, Canada.  The station airs an ethnic radio format.  It is owned by Canadian Hellenic Toronto Radio Inc., which is run by John Maniatakos and son of Peter Maniatakos who owns the Odyssey Television Network.  CHTO's programming is predominantly Greek, although it is mandated to air programming in other languages as well.  CHTO's radio studios are on Danforth Avenue in the Riverdale neighbourhood.

By day, CHTO is powered at 6,000 watts.  But to avoid interference to other radio stations, at night it reduces power to 1,000 watts.  It uses a non-directional antenna.  The transmitter is on Waterman Avenue at Hollinger Road in the O'Connor-Parkview neighbourhood near the Don River.  It also is heard on a repeater station, CHTO-1 at 1490 kHz in Mississauga.

History
Mrs. Maniatakos operated a closed circuit specialty audio service in Toronto since 1966 under the name CHCR-FM.  This service aired Greek language programming 24 hours a day.  It was initially available as an SCMO service (via CKFM-FM) but subsequently switched to cable and was available on Rogers Digital Cable channel 959, as part of their digital radio offerings, in Toronto and area. 
In 2007 when CHTO launched, CHCR-FM was discontinued and CHTO now airs in its place on Rogers Cable. 

The station was initially going to launch by the end of 2006, but this was pushed back due to technical problems. It has been on the air since .

On June 10, 2009, CHTO applied to the Canadian Radio-television and Telecommunications Commission (CRTC) to increase the daytime transmitting power to 3,000 watts, in an effort to serve communities in Mississauga and Brampton.  The request received approval on November 5, 2009.  CHTO began broadcasting at its new power as of March 2010.

On December 4, 2012, the CRTC approved a change in ownership of the station to John Maniatakos due to the 2009 death of his mother, original owner Mrs. Maniatakos.

On October 14, 2015, Canadian Hellenic Toronto Radio Inc. submitted an application to add an AM transmitter at Mississauga. The new transmitter operates at 1490 kHz with a daytime power of 23 watts and a night time power of 770 watts. The call sign for 1490 AM is CHTO-1.  This application was approved on September 1, 2016.

References

External links
CHTO AM1690

Broadcasting Decision CRTC 2006-117

Greek-Canadian culture
HTO
HTO
Radio stations established in 2007
2007 establishments in Ontario